Bartolomeo Bulgarini ( – 1378), also known as Bulgarino or Bologhini, was an Italian painter of the Trecento period in Siena both before and after the Black Death.

Early life
Born into a noble family with several members being elected to the Council of Nine, Siena’s central governing body, several times. He is firmly in the Sienese school of painting using a Byzantine-esque figuration and traditional gold leaf aesthetic of Sienese painting. With his contemporaries, Simone Martini, Pietro Lorenzetti and Ambrogio Lorenzetti and others he is part of the generations following Duccio. He was recognised in his lifetime as one of the most talented Sienese painters of the mid-14th century and is the only one of his generation to be mentioned by Giorgio Vasari.

History

Bulgarini’s oeuvre has seen much controversy in its reconstructions, with works formerly attributed to Ugolino Lorenzetti, a composite name constructed in 1917 by Bernard Berenson, referencing the stylistic similarities to Ugolino Di Niero and Pietro Lorenzetti, which he attached to a small body of nine paintings believed to all be by the same unknown Sienese artist. The paintings were grouped on a similar visual fluency, style and formula demonstrating a distinctly “Ugolini-esque” aesthetic. However, of those nine paintings six were later attributed to "The master of the Ovile Madonna" by Ernst Dewald on the grounds of a perceived fundamental stylistic difference he claimed separated the paintings. It wasn’t until Millard Meiss made the argument that the works attributed to both "The master of the Ovile Madonna" and "Ugolino Lorenzetti" might actually be by the same artist, Bulgarini. San Pietro a Ovile was the parish church in the district where Bulgarini and his wife lived for most of their married life. Much of the difficulty in constructing his oeuvre is due to the lack of documentation needed to establish the painter's authorship and timeline of his work. The only known autographed work by Bulgarini is the St. Victor altarpiece in Siena Cathedral. It was not until much later when several documents were found and the St Victor Altarpiece was reconstructed that we are able to have a clearer picture of his artistic career. Bulgarini was almost exclusively a panel painter, which is rare among 14th century Sienese painters. He may have completed manuscripts or frescoes that remain unattributed or were painted over, but no such works have yet been discovered.

The St. Victor Altarpiece

This altarpiece (1348–1350), found in the Siena Cathedral, was one of four altarpieces commissioned by the Commune, that depict the four patrons saints of the city. The other three altarpieces: St Ansanus by Simone Martini, St Crescentious by Ambrogio Lorenzetti and St Savinus by Pietro Lorenzetti; were identified earlier because the panels were signed and dated, and because of 15th century inventories from the cathedral. However, none of these sources were consistent in mentioning the St Victor Altarpiece. It wasn’t until the late 16th century that previously lost inventories, made by Guigurta Tommasi, named Bulgarini as the painter of the St Victor altarpiece.

Career

The earliest mention of Bulgarini is in 1338 for a payment made for painting the cover of the Biccherna, the book containing the financial transactions for the Commune starting in the thirteenth century until the fifteenth century. He entered the workshop of Pietro Lorenzetti as an apprentice or assistant. In 1341 and 1342 he was commissioned for two more covers for consecutive seasons.  His career, starting roughly in the 1330s, lasted into the 1370s. The earliest of his surviving works is the triptych with Saints Ansanus and Galganus painted circa 1339 for the Palazzo Pubblico. His last documented work supposedly signed and dated 1373, which is now lost, was a panel painting for the hospital of Santa Maria Della Scala in Siena although he was active up until his death in 1378.

The Assumption of the Virgin and Doubting Thomas Altarpiece

The Assumption of the Virgin with Doubting Thomas (early 1360s)  is a large panel painted by Bulgarini. It was part of an altarpiece for the chapel which housed a group of important relics acquired by the Santa Maria della Scala Hospital from Constantinople, which included the Virgin’s belt or girdle that she cast down to Thomas as tangible proof of her physical ascent to heaven. The importance of the relics is reflected in the composition of the panel painted by Bulgarini. Bulgarini’s somewhat unusual portrayal of Thomas with his back to the viewer differs from other iconography of the period, perhaps representing the position of the parishioners and Sienese officiants in worship of the virgin and the recently acquired relics in the newly constructed chapel.

Works
Works attributed to Bulgarini are found at the Isabella Stewart Gardner Art Museum in Boston; the Fogg Art Museum in Cambridge; the Städel Art Museum in Frankfurt (Blinding of St Victor); and 
the Wallraf Richartz Art Museum in Cologne (Enthroned Madonna and Child).
Bulgarini's name came into prominence in January 2021, when a Botticelli painting was sold at Sotheby's for a record 80 million dollars (over 92 million after fees and commission). It was called "Young Man holding a Roundel" and in the roundel was an original painting of a bearded man (probably a saint), attributed to Bulgarini.

References

Further reading
 Boskovitz, Miklos, ed. The Alana Collection: Italian Paintings from the 13th to 15th century. Firenze: Edizioni Polistampa, 2009.
 Meiss, Millard. "Ugolino Lorenzetti". The Art Bulletin, Vol. 13, No. 3 (1931), pp. 376–397. Accessed: 06/04/2012 18:05. https://www.jstor.org/stable/3050804
 McClannan, Anne. “Bulgarini’s Assumption with Doubting Thomas: Art, Trade, and Faith in Post-Plague Siena”. Fleming, K.E., Adnan A. Husain ed. A Faithful Sea: The Religious Cultures of The Mediterranean, 1200-1700. Oxford: Oneworld, 2007. 
 (see index; plate 7)
Steinhoff, Judith B. 2007. Sienese painting after the Black Death: artistic pluralism, politics, and the new art market. Cambridge: Cambridge University Press.

1300s births
1378 deaths
Year of birth uncertain
14th-century Italian painters
Italian male painters
Painters from Siena